Julie Lynn Harris (born 7 January 1969) is an English former cricketer who played as an all-rounder. She was a right-arm medium bowler and right-handed batter. She appeared in two One Day Internationals for England in the 1989 Women's European Cricket Cup, against Denmark and Ireland. She took 2 wickets at an average of 16.50. She played domestic cricket for West Midlands and Staffordshire.

References

External links
 
 

1969 births
Living people
Sportspeople from Northamptonshire
England women One Day International cricketers
Staffordshire women cricketers
West Midlands women cricketers